Harrison Albright (May 17, 1866 – January 3, 1932) was an American architect best known for his design of the West Baden Springs Hotel in Orange County, Indiana.

Biography 

Born in the Ogontz neighborhood of North Philadelphia, Pennsylvania, Albright was educated in the local public schools and at the Peirce College of Business and Spring Garden Institute in Philadelphia. In 1886, he began his architecture business designing residential and public projects in Philadelphia.  

He moved to Charleston, West Virginia in 1891 and was architect for the State of West Virginia in addition to designing residential projects.  As State architect he designed an annex to the State Capitol, a state asylum at Huntington, West Virginia, the Miners' Hospital in Fairmont, West Virginia and buildings at Shepherd University and the Preparatory Branch of West Virginia University at Keyser.

In 1901, he was hired by Indiana hotelier Lee Wiley Sinclair to design the landmark West Baden Springs Hotel which included a  steel and glass dome.  

In 1905, he moved his architectural practice to California, working in Los Angeles and San Diego, as early proponent of reinforced concrete construction.  

John L. Wright, son of Frank Lloyd Wright, was employed in the Albright firm.

Harrison Albright retired from architecture for health reasons in 1925 and died in 1932.

Works 

Albright's designs include:

 One Bridge Place, Charleston, West Virginia, 1898
 Upshur County Courthouse, Buckhannon, West Virginia, 1901
 West Baden Springs Hotel, 1902
 Hotel Richmond, Richmond, Virginia, 1904
 expansion of Homer Laughlin Building Annex/Lyon Building, Los Angeles, California, 1905
 Santa Fe Freight Depot, Los Angeles, California (now home to the Southern California Institute of Architecture), 1907
 Coronado Library, Coronado, California, 1909
 U. S. Grant Hotel, San Diego, California, 1910
 Eli P. Clark Hotel, Los Angeles, 1912
 Spreckels Theater Building, San Diego, California, 1912
 Golden West Hotel, San Diego, 1913
 Spreckels Organ Pavilion, San Diego, California, 1915
 Bank of Coronado Building, Coronado, California, 1917
 Adams School, Maricopa, Arizona
 Spreckels Mansion, Coronado, California
 Waldo Hotel, Clarksburg, West Virginia
 Columbus Power House, Columbus, Indiana

External links
Emporis listing
Philadelphia Architects and Buildings database (extensive information)

Concrete pioneers
1866 births
1932 deaths
Architects from California
Architects from Philadelphia
Peirce College people
19th-century American architects
20th-century American architects
Architects from Charleston, West Virginia